Anhai is a town in southern Fujian province, People's Republic of China. It is located in the far southern suburbs of the Quanzhou metropolitan area. and is separated by Weitou Bay from Kinmen, which is controlled by the Republic of China on Taiwan. Administratively, Anhai is part of Jinjiang County-level City, which in its turn is subordinated to Quanzhou.

History

Anhai was known as Anping during the Song dynasty. The famous Song-era Anping Bridge crosses a tidal estuary to the west of town, connecting Anhai with its western neighbor, the town of Shuitou, which administratively belongs in Nan'an. Shuixin Chan Temple is located by the eastern end of the bridge.

Anhai was an important port during the Ming and early Qing periods. Anhai regained importance in the later 19th century when sand bars created by the Jin and Luo rivers blocked the principal harbor for Quanzhou; the city retained its size and importance to local trade but maritime commerce was redirected to Anhai.

Notes

References

Township-level divisions of Fujian
Jinjiang, Fujian